Schroder AsiaPacific Fund plc is a large United Kingdom-based investment trust focused predominantly on equity holdings in companies located in Asia and countries bordering the Pacific Ocean (but excluding the Middle East, Japan and Australasia).  Established in November 1995, the company is listed on the London Stock Exchange and is a constituent of the FTSE 250 Index. The fund has been managed by Matthew Dobbs of Schroders since its inception and its chairman is Nicholas Smith.

References

External links

Investment trusts of the United Kingdom
Financial services companies established in 1995
British companies established in 1995
Companies listed on the London Stock Exchange